Northumberland was a 74-gun  of the French Navy.

Career 
She took part in the Battle of the Chesapeake on 5 September 1781 under Bon Chrétien de Bricqueville. Seven months later, she took part in Battle of the Saintes on 12 April 1782 under Captain Cresp de Saint-Césaire, who was killed in the action. In 1782, she captured the 14-gun sloop .

Northumberland was captured during the Glorious First of June in 1794, where she was captained by François-Pierre Étienne. She was recommissioned in the Royal Navy as HMS Northumberland, and was broken up the next year in December 1795.

Sources and references 
 Notes

Citations

References
 
 

Ships of the line of the French Navy
Ships of the line of the Royal Navy
Annibal-class ships of the line
1780 ships
Captured ships